The 1975 Memphis State Tigers football team represented Memphis State University (now known as the University of Memphis) as an independent during the 1975 NCAA Division I football season. In its first season under head coach Richard Williamson, the team compiled an 7–4 record and outscored opponents by a total of 180 to 168. The team played its home games at Liberty Bowl Memorial Stadium in Memphis, Tennessee. 

The team's statistical leaders included Lloyd Patterson with 371 passing yards, Terdell Middleton with 586 rushing yards and 42 points scored, and Ricky Rivas with 224 receiving yards.

Schedule

References

Memphis State
Memphis Tigers football seasons
Memphis State Tigers football